The name Queenie is an affectionate, or pet use, of the term queen - and is thought to be derived from the Old English word 'cwen', meaning 'woman' rather than a reference to the monarch or his wife.

As a first name it can also mean "Royal Lady" or "Ruler". In this sense the name is also used as a nickname or pet name for a girl who shares her first name with a Queen. As such, it was popular name during Victorian times in the British Empire. It was once very popular in London's East End.

Given name
 Queenie Chu (born 1981), Hong Kong television presenter and actress
 Q. D. Leavis (1900-1982), English literary critic and essayist
 Queenie McKenzie (circa 1930-1998), indigenous Australian artist
 Queenie Rosson (1889-1978), American silent film actress
 Queenie Smith (1898-1978), American stage, film and television actress
 Queenie Thomas (1898–1977), British actress
 Queenie Watts (1926-1980), English actress and singer
 Queenie Ashton (1903-1999), stage name of British-born soprano and English and Australian character actress Ethel Muriel Cover (née Ashton)

Nickname
 Mary Jane Cain (1844–1929), Aboriginal Australian human rights activist
 Queenie Newall (1854–1929), British archer
 Merle Oberon (1911–1979), Anglo-Indian actress
 Jimmy O'Rourke (baseball) (1883–1955), American professional baseball player
 Stephanie St. Clair (1886–1969), a French gangster who operated out of New York's Harlem

Stage names
Queenie Leighton (1874-1943), stage name of British music hall star Lilian Caroline Augusta Rickard
Queenie Leonard (1905-2002), stage name of English character actress and singer Pearl Walker
Queenie, a performer in the English hip pop quintet KING
Queenie Williams (1896-1962), stage name of Australian actress Alfreda Ina Williams

Animals
Queenie (Melbourne elephant) (put down in 1944)
Queenie (waterskiing elephant) (1952-2011)

Fictional characters
Queenie (Blackadder), a caricature of Elizabeth I of England in the British TV series Blackadder
"Queenie" (EastEnders)
Queenie Yoh, a character in the 2018 Japanese anime "Lost Hope"
the main character from Queenie (miniseries)
A character in the musical Show Boat
A character in The Curious Case of Benjamin Button
A character in the short story of the same name by Nobel Prize winning writer Alice Munro
 Queenie Goldstein, a main character in the Fantastic Beasts film series.
A character on the show American Horror Story
The name of the dog in the short story "A Christmas Memory"
A character based on Hester Maria Elphinstone, Viscountess Keith in the Aubrey–Maturin book series
A character in Joseph Moncure March's poem "The Wild Party" and in two musicals of the same name by Andrew Lippa and Michael John LaChiusa
 Magdalene "Queenie" Shaw, a character from the Fast & Furious franchise
Queenie Gibbons, younger daughter of Frank and Ethel Gibbons in the Noel Coward play This Happy Breed
 Queenie Pickering, a character from Emma Carroll's book Letters From The Lighthouse

External links
"Queenie" entry on Nameberry

Given names
Feminine given names
Filipino feminine given names
Lists of people by nickname